The PLUG Independent Music Awards, or just PLUG Awards, began in 2001 as a "cartel" of music lovers ranging from DJs and managers to indie retailers and fans.

Winners

Album of the Year

Americana Album of the Year

Avant Album of the Year

DJ Album of the Year

Electronic/Dance Album of the Year

Hip-Hop Album of the Year

Indie Rock Album of the Year

Metal Album of the Year

Punk Album of the Year

Album Art/Packaging of the Year

Music DVD of the Year

Music Video of the Year

Song of the Year

Artist of the Year

New Artist of the Year

Live Act of the Year

Female Artist of the Year

Male Artist of the Year

2005
 PLUG Artist Impact Award: The Flaming Lips
 Record Producer of the Year: Danger Mouse
 Record Label of the Year: Definitive Jux
 Music Website of the Year: Pitchfork
 Magazine of the Year: The Wire
 College/Non-Comm Radio Station of the Year: KEXP-FM, Seattle, Washington
 Record Store of the Year: Amoeba Music, Hollywood, California
 Specialty Show of the Year: KDLD, Los Angeles, California – Dead Air
 Internet Radio Station of the Year: WOXY.com

2006
 PLUG Artist Impact Award: The Flaming Lips
 Record Producer of the Year: Danger Mouse
 Record Label of the Year: Sub Pop
 Music Festival of the Year : Coachella
 Music Website of the Year: Myspace
 Magazine of the Year: Paste
 College/Non-Comm Radio Station of the Year: KEXP-FM, Seattle, Washington
 Record Store of the Year: Amoeba Music, Hollywood, California
 Zine of the Year: Wax Poetics
 Specialty Show of the Year: WXPN, Philadelphia, Pennsylvania – World Café with David Dye
 Internet Radio Station of the Year: indie1031.fm

2007
 Record Producer of the Year: J Dilla
 Record Label of the Year: Sub Pop
 Live Music Venue of the Year: Bowery Ballroom, New York City
 Music Festival of the Year: South by Southwest
 Music Website of the Year: Pitchfork
 Music Blog of the Year: BrooklynVegan
 Magazine of the Year: Paste
 College/Non-Comm Radio Station of the Year: KEXP-FM, Seattle, Washington
 Record Store of the Year: Amoeba Music, Hollywood, California
 Zine of the Year: Wax Poetics
 Specialty Show of the Year: Sirius Left of Center – Blog Radio
 Podcast of the Year: WOXY.com – Lounge Acts
 Internet Radio Station of the Year: WOXY.com
 Online Radio Station of the Year (with Terrestrial Counterpart): KEXP-FM, Seattle
 Online Record Store of the Year: Amazon.com

2008
 Record Label of the Year: Merge Records
 Live Music Venue of the Year: Bowery Ballroom, New York City
 Music Festival of the Year: Coachella Valley Music and Arts Festival
 Music Website of the Year: Pitchfork
 Music Blog of the Year: Stereogum
 Magazine of the Year: Paste
 College/Non-Comm Radio Station of the Year: KEXP-FM, Seattle, Washington
 Record Store of the Year: Other Music, New York City
 Zine of the Year: Wax Poetics
 Specialty Show of the Year: Sirius Left of Center – Blog Radio
 Online Radio Station of the Year: KCRW, Santa Monica, California
 Online Record Store of the Year: iTunes

External links 
 

American music awards
Awards established in 2001